Pressure Drop is the second solo album by Robert Palmer, released in 1975. Palmer is backed by Little Feat and other musicians. The title track is a cover version of the reggae hit by Toots & the Maytals. However, many other songs on the album use "New Orleans funk ... along with smooth, dated disco ballads smothered in strings". Continuing his association with Little Feat started by his cover of "Sailing Shoes" on his 1974 debut album Sneaking Sally Through the Alley, Feat was used as backing band on several cuts, most notably Lowell George's slide guitar on "Here With You Tonight". George also contributed the tune "Trouble" on which Feat pianist Bill Payne plays the intro. David Jeffries' review says that the album is considered "too blue-eyed and polished for fans of Palmer's more gutsy moments" but concludes that "Pressure Drop has grown into the great overlooked album in Palmer's discography". In June of 2009 (issue 187), the album was ranked as No. 20 on Mojo's list of the 50 best records released by Island. The album peaked at No. 136 in the US.  

Songs "Give Me an Inch" and "Which of Us Is the Fool" were issued as singles; a music video was produced for the latter. According to former bandmate Pete Gage, the song "Here with You Tonight" was written towards the end of Palmer's time in Vinegar Joe.

Cover model was Carinthia West.

Track listing
All songs by Robert Palmer except where noted.
"Give Me an Inch" – 3:17
"Work to Make It Work" – 4:27
"Back in My Arms" – 3:30
"River Boat" (Allen Toussaint) – 3:44
"Pressure Drop" (Frederick Hibbert) – 5:26
"Here with You Tonight" (Robert Palmer, Pete Gage) – 4:57
"Trouble" (Lowell George) – 2:25
"Fine Time" – 5:43
"Which of Us Is the Fool" – 3:25

Featured on the 2013 CD reissue by Edsel (which is bundled with Sneakin' Sally Through the Alley) are acoustic demos of "Willin'" (George) and "Hope We Never Wake". Palmer rerecorded "Work to Make It Work" for his final studio album featuring original compositions, 1999's Rhythm & Blues (released in 1998 in Japan). In 2012, the song was featured in the action-adventure video game Sleeping Dogs.

Personnel
 Robert Palmer – vocals, percussion
 Lowell George – guitar, backing vocals
 Bill Payne – keyboards
 Paul Barrère – guitar, backing vocals
 Richie Hayward – drums, percussion, backing vocals
 Kenny Gradney – bass guitar
 James Jamerson – bass guitar
 Sam Clayton – backing vocals
 Ed Greene – drums, percussion
 Jean Roussel – clavinet, keyboards, Hammond organ B3
 Gordon DeWitty – clavinet
 Gene Page – strings
 The Muscle Shoals Horns – horns
 Mel Collins – saxophone, flute
 Mongezi Feza – trumpet, flageolet
 Ray Allen – trombone
 Vicki Brown – backing vocals
 Fran Tate – backing vocals
 David Snell – harp
 Joe Brown – banjo
 Steve York – harmonica
 Martin Frye – tuba
Technical
 Steve Smith – production
 Phill Brown – engineering
 Graham Hughes – cover concept, design, photography
 Carinthia West – front and back cover model (uncredited)
Paul Barrère, Lowell George, Kenny Gradney, Richie Hayward, Bill Payne and Sam Clayton were members of Little Feat at the time. Fran Tate sang backup vocals on some Little Feat records, extending the Little Feat connection.

See also
 List of albums released in 1975

References

External links

Robert Palmer (singer) albums
1975 albums
Island Records albums